A facultative anaerobic organism is an organism that makes ATP by aerobic respiration if oxygen is present, but is capable of switching to fermentation if oxygen is absent.

Some examples of facultatively anaerobic bacteria are Staphylococcus spp., Escherichia coli, Salmonella, Listeria spp., Shewanella oneidensis and Yersinia pestis. Certain eukaryotes are also facultative anaerobes, including fungi such as Saccharomyces cerevisiae and many aquatic invertebrates such as nereid polychaetes.

As pathogens 
Since facultative anaerobes are able to grow in both the presence and absence of oxygen, they can survive in many different environments, adapt easily to changing conditions, and thus have a selective advantage over other bacteria. As a result, most life-threatening pathogens are facultative anaerobes.

See also 
 Aerobic respiration
 Anaerobic respiration
 Fermentation
 Obligate aerobe
 Obligate anaerobe
 Microaerophile

References

External links 
 Facultative Anaerobic Bacteria
 Obligate Anaerobic Bacteria
 Anaerobic Bacteria and Anaerobic Bacteria in the decomposition (stabilization) of organic matter.

Anaerobic respiration
Cellular respiration